Pauline Kedem Tallen OFR (born 8 January 1959 )  is a Nigerian politician and the current Minister for Women Affairs Minister and Social Development. She was appointed in 2019 by President Muhammadu Buhari after turning down ambassadorial nomination in 2015 on the grounds that she was not consulted prior to the announcement of the  appointment and that she would not accept the offer for equal distribution of power among the three senatorial districts of her native state of plateau because she is from same local government as Governor Simon Lalong. 

In 1999, she was appointed Minister of State for science and technology to the cabinet of former president, Olusegun Obasanjo. In 2007, she became the deputy governor of Plateau State and  the first woman to be a deputy governor in northern Nigeria.  she also contested to be governor of the state in 2011, but lost to Jonah Jang. She is presently a member, board of trustees of All Progressive Congress, and was honoured as woman of the year for her contribution to Nigeria at the 10th African Icon of Our Generation Award. She is a board member of National Agency for Control of Aids (NACA).

Early life and education 
Tallen is a native of Shendam, to the family of Kattiems. She got a degree in sociology at the University of Jos in 1982.

Political career 
Tallen's political career started in 1976, when she was the clerical officer at Shendam local government council, then later ministry of local government affairs.
In 2011, she joined Labour Party, then contested in the gubernatorial election of the state. By 1994, she was made a councillor in Plateau State. She was made commissioner in the state by the military government between 1994 and 1999.

In 1999, she was appointed Minister of State for Science and Technology, becoming the first woman to be appointed as a minister in that capacity by former president, Olusegun Obasanjo.

Before the 2015 general elections, she decamped from PDP to APC, a move she believed angered some people in her state. However, she described the move as a calling from God, with no regrets. In 2015, she rejected an ambassadorial nomination by President Buhari, citing federal character and zoning in her state as reasons. In an interview with Leadership, she explained that as deputy governor she contested against the governor for the betterment of the state and because the governor didn't have the interest of the people at heart. She also stated that the victory of President Buhari at the 2015 general elections was divinely orchestrated.

Personal life 
She was married to John Tallen, a chieftain of the People's Democratic Party who died in 2017.  She has five children.

In 2013, Tallen's son took her to court for disrupting his freedom of expression and movement. She however responded a few days later by having her son charged to court for burglary and theft of her jewelries for which her son was remanded in prison custody.

Awards 

 Merit Award by the National body of the National Council of Women Societies Abuja, for Outstanding contribution to the Development of Women in Nigeria – 1996
 Merit Award by the National Association of Plateau State Students Bauchi Federal Polytechnic for contributions towards the development of Education and Health Care in the State – 1996
 National Merit Award Honours in Science and Technology by the Executive Council of the Nigerian Engineering Scientific Forum – 1st July 2002.
 Merit Award in recognition on contributions to the development of womanhood in our great Nation, Nigeria and also in appreciation of her support for the sustenance of NCWS activities nationwide – 14th July 2001
 Plateau State Youth Council Merit Award in recognition of contribution to the growth and development of Youths in Plateau State Nigeria – 8th December 2002.
 Intra-Continental Media Network, ECOWAS DISTINGUISHED CORPORATE AWARD achievers Gold Award for unparalleled and imperishable contributions to the overall development of Nigeria and the Sub-region in both areas of economy and business. Having left an indelible legacy worthy of emulation by all and sundry.
 Award as Ambassador of National Assignment by the National Unity, Peace and Patriotic Ambassadors Foundation (NUPPAF).
 Award by the Nigerian Community in the U.S.A. for her Tremendous contribution towards the development of Science and Technology in Nigeria – May 2002
 NBRRI Award in appreciation and recognition of service rendered towards the growth and development of Science and Technology in general and Nigerian Building and Road Research Institute in particular- 24 March 2004.
 Award of Excellence by the National Association of Zumunta USA Inc. Washington D.C – January 2000.
 Award as Model of Peace – Presented by Maryann Music Word Ministries Jos -2007
 Crime Fighter Award 2006/2007-The People Police Award of The Nigerian Police Force
 Award of Excellence as Pride of Mothers by Catholic Women of Nigeria, Abuja- 23rd August, 2014.
 African Icon of Our Generation Award 2015 (Woman of the Year Award)Presented by International Center for Comparative Leadership for Africans and Blacks in Diaspora and Accolade Communications Limited
 Being the International Human Rights Day. Award of Ambassador of “My Body, My Right” (Cervical Cancer Campaign)
 (NCWS) Nigeria in Collaboration with (1 Ykow Global Foundation) Certificate of Merit National Award of Excellence on Service to Humanity. 22nd November, 2016.
 20th of January, 2017 by Nigerian Role Models (A Compendium of distinguished Nigeria) Merit Award. The Most Valuable Quintessential Ambassador of the Year Award in our 9th African Leader Par Excellence Award 2016, which was held on the 15th of December, 2016 at Excellence Hotel, Ogba Lagos.
 By Commonwealth Youth Council (CYC) Feb. 2017. Nelson Mendela’s Africa Patriots Award, as African Patriotic Leader.
 Lifetime Achievement Award By UNDP, 2023.

References 

1959 births
Living people
Recipients of the Order of the Federal Republic
University of Jos alumni
People from Plateau State
Federal ministers of Nigeria
Women government ministers of Nigeria
All Progressives Congress politicians
Labour Party (Nigeria) politicians
Peoples Democratic Party (Nigeria) politicians
Deputy Governors of Plateau State
Women state deputy governors of Nigeria
20th-century Nigerian politicians
20th-century Nigerian women politicians
21st-century Nigerian politicians
21st-century Nigerian women politicians